Chuykova is a rural locality in Besedinsky Selsoviet Rural Settlement, Kursky District, Kursk Oblast, Russia. Population:

Geography 
The village is located on the Rat River (a right tributary of the Seym), 101 km from the Russia–Ukraine border, 13 km south-east of the district center – the town Kursk, 3.5 km from the selsoviet center – Besedino.

 Climate
Chuykova has a warm-summer humid continental climate (Dfb in the Köppen climate classification).

Transport 
Chuykova is located 3.5 km from the federal route  (Kursk – Voronezh –  "Kaspy" Highway; a part of the European route ), on the road of intermunicipal significance  (R-298 – Belomestnoye – Kuvshinnoye), 5.5 km from the nearest railway halt Zaplava (railway line Klyukva — Belgorod).

The rural locality is situated 13 km from Kursk Vostochny Airport, 115 km from Belgorod International Airport and 193 km from Voronezh Peter the Great Airport.

References

Notes

Sources

Rural localities in Kursky District, Kursk Oblast